The rufous-throated tanager (Ixothraupis rufigula) is a species of bird in the family Thraupidae. It is found in Colombia and Ecuador.

Its natural habitats are subtropical or tropical moist montane forests and heavily degraded former forest.

References

rufous-throated tanager
Birds of the Colombian Andes
Birds of the Ecuadorian Andes
rufous-throated tanager
rufous-throated tanager
Taxonomy articles created by Polbot
Taxobox binomials not recognized by IUCN